WordJong is a puzzle video game developed by American teams Gameblend Studios and Magellan Interactive and published by Destineer for the Nintendo DS. The gameplay of WordJong combines the elements of Mahjong and Scrabble. WordJong was then released in Europe on September 17, 2010, and in Australia on September 30, 2010, which was published by Funbox Media.

Gameplay
WordJong is a puzzle game. It features simple, but attention-grabbing gameplay. The game uses an achievement system quite similar to Xbox Live, featuring 39 possible medallions that the player can earn. WordJong consists of a dictionary with more than 100,000 words. The goal is to clear the board and use all of the tiles provided in the game.

Reception

WordJong has received generally positive reviews from critics. Frank Provo of GameSpot stated that "Scrabble-style mahjong is pleasantly addictive." Nintendo World Report (NWR) editor, Mike Gamin, mentioned the game's variety of modes.

The game also received some negative reviews. IGN pointed out that there is barely anyone who wants to challenge another person through the Nintendo Wi-Fi Connection and that there is no tutorial provided. And, IGN mentioned that if you undid a move, there was no way to redo it. GameSpot also pointed out that the graphics and audio of the game were very plain. The NWR stated that there aren't any online communication options.

References

External links
Official website
WordJong at Funbox Media
WordJong at Magellan Interactive

Mahjong
Nintendo DS games
Nintendo DS-only games
Nintendo Wi-Fi Connection games
Puzzle video games
Scrabble software
Scrabble variants
Multiplayer and single-player video games
2007 video games
Video games developed in the United States